Jack Clisby is an Australian football (soccer) player who plays as a centre back or left back, for A-League side Perth Glory.

Club career
Clisby made his senior debut for Perth Glory on 26 January 2013, starting against Brisbane Roar. Clisby played 29 games for Perth Glory. He was then signed with Melbourne City in January 2015 for the 15/16 season. Clisby then played for Western Sydney Wanderers followed by Central Coast Mariners. In June 2021, Clisby returned to Perth Glory.

External links

References 

1992 births
Soccer players from Perth, Western Australia
Australian soccer players
Association football defenders
A-League Men players
National Premier Leagues players
Perth Glory FC players
Melbourne City FC players
Western Sydney Wanderers FC players
Central Coast Mariners FC players
Living people